Osmany Santiago Uriarte Mestre (born ) is a Cuban male volleyball player. In 2016 he has been convicted of rape.

He was part of the Cuba men's national volleyball team at the 2014 FIVB Volleyball Men's World Championship in Poland. He played for Sancti Spíritus. He was one of the six players of the Cuban national volleyball team arrested and charged with aggravated rape in July 2016 in Tampere, Finland. He was found guilty in September 2016 and was sentenced to five years in prison.

Clubs
 Sancti Spíritus (2014)
 Maliye Milli Piyango (2015)
 Inegol Belediyespor (2018–2019)
 Galatasaray (2020)
 Cizre Belediyespor (2021)

References

1995 births
Living people
Cuban men's volleyball players
Cuban people imprisoned abroad
Place of birth missing (living people)
Cuban people convicted of rape
Prisoners and detainees of Finland
Expatriates in Finland